Tripartite symbiosis is a type of symbiosis involving three species. This can include any combination of plants, animals, fungi, bacteria, or archaea, often in interkingdom symbiosis.

Ants

Fungus-growing ants 

Ants of Attini cultivate fungi. Microfungi, specialized to be parasites of the fungus gardens, coevolved with them.

Allomerus-Hirtella-Trimmatostroma 

Allomerus decemarticulatus ants use Trimmatostroma sp. to create structures within Hirtella physophora. The fungi are connected endophytically and actively transfer nitrogen.

Lichen 

The mycobiont in a lichen can form a relationship with both cyanobacteria and green algae as photobionts concurrently.

Legumes 

Rhizobia are nitrogen-fixating bacteria that form symbiotic relationships with legumes. Sometimes, this is aided by the presence of a fungal species. This is most effective in undistributed soil. The presence of mycorrhizae can improve the rhizobial-liquorice nutrient transfer in droughts. Soybeans in particular can improve their ability to withstand soil salinity with the presence of both rhizobium and mycorrhizae.

References 

Symbiosis